Angel-Eye, pseudonym of Angela Shuman, née Brouwers (born 11 September 1974) is a Dutch artist, composer and producer who since her solo recorddeal with EMI BELGIUM has been collaborating with René Shuman since 2000. Since 2003 they have appeared together on stage as the duo Shuman & Angel-Eye, Mr. & Mrs. Rock'n Roll. Brouwers composes and produces music and develops marketing projects. She wrote many well-known advertising tunes and songs for advertising.

René Shuman contacted her following a TV documentary in 2000 about her activities. Together they produced the tune for an Audi commercial that was broadcast worldwide. In 2001 they also produce Shuman's comeback album Set the clock on Rock!. From 2003 they successfully continued together as a duo under the name "Shuman & Angel-Eye". Since then she has been producing their joint TV productions. As Shuman & Angel-Eye they now have several golden records/DVDs. She and Shuman got married 14th February 2010.

References

1974 births
Living people
Dutch guitarists
Dutch producers
Dutch composers
People from Bunde
21st-century Dutch singers
21st-century Dutch women singers